The 2002 Men's Hockey Hamburg Masters was the eighth edition of the Hamburg Masters, consisting of a series of test matches. It was held in Hamburg, Germany, from 14 to 16 June 2002, and featured four of the top nations in men's field hockey.

Competition format
The tournament featured the national teams of Argentina, Malaysia, Spain, and the hosts, Germany, competing in a round-robin format, with each team playing each other once. Three points were awarded for a win, one for a draw, and none for a loss.

Officials
The following umpires were appointed by the International Hockey Federation to officiate the tournament:

 Xavier Adell (ESP)
 Henrik Ehlers (DEN)
 Edmundo Saladino (ARG)
 Amarjit Singh (MAS)
 Richard Wölter (GER)

Results
All times are local (Central European Summer Time).

Pool

Fixtures

Statistics

Final standings

Goalscorers

References

External links
Deutscher Hockey-Bund

2002
Hamburg Masters
2002 in German sport
2002 in Spanish sport
Sport in Hamburg
June 2002 sports events in Europe